"Baby, It's Cold Outside" is a 1948 song by Frank Loesser.

Baby, It's Cold Outside may also refer to:

 Baby, It's Cold Outside (album), a 2001 Christmas album by Holly Cole
 Baby, It's Cold Outside (Cerys Matthews album), a 2012 album by Cerys Matthews
 "Baby It's Cold Outside" (Pezband song)
 "Baby, It's Cold Outside" (My Little Pony), a 1986 episode of My Little Pony
 "Baby, It's Cold Outside" (Home Improvement), a 1992 episode of Home Improvement
 "Baby, It's Cold Outside" (Scandal), a 2015 episode of Scandal
"Baby It's Cold Outside", a song from the 1982 album "Outlaw" by the funk band War
"Baby It's Cold Outside", the first part of the 2004 BBC documentary series The Power of Nightmares
"Baby, It's Cold Outside", a 1978 episode of M*A*S*H (season 7)
"Baby, It's Cold Outside", a 1991 Isaac Asimov short story

See also
 "It's Cold Outside", a 1966 song by The Choir
"Cold Outside", a song by country music band Big House